Corynoptera elegans is a species of dark-winged fungus gnats in the genus Corynoptera found in Buenos Aires Province of Argentina.

References

External links

Sciaridae
Insects described in 1973
Fauna of Argentina